"Virgin Territory" is the 16th episode of the third season of the American sitcom Modern Family and the series' 64th episode overall. It aired on February 22, 2012. The episode was written by Elaine Ko and directed by Jason Winer.

In the episode, Claire, Jay and Mitchell go on and confess past sins during a family brunch with Mitchell destroying one of the proudest moments of Jay's, scoring a hole-in-one at a golf game. Jay is furious about it and leaves while Mitchell decides to follow him to apologize and the two of them make up. Claire leaves for some "yoga" classes and Gloria follows her because she wants to join her. When Claire finds excuses to not do the classes with her, Gloria realizes that something is wrong and that Claire is lying. She goes back only to discover that Claire does not take yoga classes but practices at a shooting range, something that relaxes her. Luke and Manny try to get revenge on Lily for taking all the attention away from them but their plan backfires and Cameron gets injured instead while also breaking Lily's doll. Phil goes to the mall with Alex, Haley and Lily to fix the doll and on their way there, Alex accidentally reveals that Haley and Dylan have had sex, something that shocks Phil.

"Virgin Territory" received positive reviews from the critics and it won the Writers Guild Award for Episodic Comedy, while Winer was nominated for an Emmy for Outstanding Directing in a Comedy Series.

Plot
At a family brunch, the Pritchett family confess past sins starting with Claire (Julie Bowen) confessing to a long-ago transgression against Jay (Ed O'Neill).  Jay takes his turn and confesses to both Claire and Mitchell (Jesse Tyler Ferguson). Mitchell's confession ruins Jay's proudest golf moment when he reveals that he kicked Jay's ball into the hole and that Jay did not score a hole-in-one.

Meanwhile, Luke (Nolan Gould) and Manny (Rico Rodriguez) decide to take revenge on Lily (Aubrey Anderson-Emmons) for taking all of the attention away from them. The two set up a trap similar to a Rube Goldberg machine which is inadvertently tripped by Cameron (Eric Stonestreet) instead, and he injures his back and breaks Lily's doll. Phil (Ty Burrell) takes Alex (Ariel Winter), Haley (Sarah Hyland) and Lily to the mall to repair the doll. Jay leaves to the golf course and Claire leaves to "yoga", and Gloria (Sofía Vergara) decides to join her. Mitchell decides to go reconcile with his father and leaves. With everyone gone, Cameron begins a frantic search for a Tupperware he believed Claire stole from him some time ago.

At the parking lot of "yoga", Claire attempts to avoid Gloria and lies continually making Gloria eventually depart. Gloria realizes that something is wrong with Claire's excuses so she goes back. Claire finally reveals to Gloria that she is actually there for the shooting range and not for yoga because it is a great method of stress release. Gloria surprises Claire by casually shooting a bulls eye and leaving Claire to practice.

In the car, Alex accidentally reveals that Haley had sexual intercourse with Dylan (Reid Ewing), and Phil is shocked. Haley is angry with Alex and feels guilty when her dad implies how disappointed he is. At the mall, there is tension between Phil and Haley as they repair the doll and Phil makes many comments that are both dual references to Haley and the doll. In the end, the two reconcile.

At the golf course, Mitchell mistakenly reveals the false hole-in-one to Jay's friends but the two make up after remembering the incident itself.

The boys catch Cameron uninjured as he desperately searches for his Tupperware, but he gives the boys the keys to his car to wash it. The boys instead take the car for a spin to impress Manny's crush Miranda. Luke gives Manny a quick run-down of the car and they leave. Manny awkwardly drives and fails to impress Miranda. As the boys drive back their mom gets home, but before she can punish the boys, Cameron falls inside and gets injured, but he is satisfied that he has found his Tupperware.

Reception

Ratings
In its original American broadcast "Virgin Territory" was watched by 11.54 million; up 0.32 million from the previous episode.

Reviews

"Virgin Territory" received positive reviews.

Leigh Raines of TV Fanatic rated the episode with 5/5. "I found this episode to be the perfect combination of funny and heartwarming. It never hurts to add realistic moments in every . That's what Modern Family is good at and I'm glad they embraced it so well this week."

Meredith Blake from The A.V. Club gave a B rate to the episode saying that the episode was very funny but it suffered from a bit of narrative entropy.

Tim Martens of Custodian Film Critic rated the episode with 4/5 stating: "We really got to some deep subjects on this week’s “Modern Family.” [...]  this week’s episode (titled “Virgin Territory”) touches on all the secrets that are kept deep within a family."

Shayelizatrotter from The Comedy Critic gave the episode an A− rate. "While this episode was, in my opinion, not as hilarious as the last, it was still full of great, comical moments!"

Accolades
This episode won the Writers Guild of America Award for Television: Episodic Comedy.

Jason Winer was nominated for a Primetime Emmy Award for this episode.

References

External links

"Virgin Territory" at ABC.com

2012 American television episodes
Modern Family (season 3) episodes